William Garvie (1837 – December 15, 1872) was a lawyer, journalist and political figure in Nova Scotia, Canada. He represented Halifax County in the Nova Scotia House of Assembly as a Liberal from 1871 to 1872.

He was born in the West Indies, the son of John Garvie, of Scottish descent, and came to Halifax with his parents. In 1863, with Edmund Mortimer McDonald, he founded the Halifax Citizen, a newspaper opposed to Confederation. In 1866, Garvie retired from the paper, studied law at Lincoln's Inn and was called to the bar there in 1869. In 1870, he returned to Nova Scotia, setting up practice in Halifax. The following year, he was named commissioner of public works and mines in the province's Executive Council. Ill with tuberculosis, he was only able to appear once in the provincial assembly, speaking in support of the government. Garvie died at Hyères in the south of France while attempting to recover from the disease.

References 

1837 births
1872 deaths
Nova Scotia Liberal Party MLAs